Tanya Marie Luhrmann (born 1959) is an American psychological anthropologist known for her studies of modern-day witches, charismatic Christians, and studies of how culture shapes psychotic, dissociative, and related experiences. She has also studied culture and morality, and the training of psychiatrists. She is Watkins University Professor in the Anthropology Department at Stanford University. Luhrmann was elected to the American Philosophical Society in 2022.

Profile
Luhrmann received her AB summa cum laude in Folklore and Mythology from Harvard-Radcliffe in 1981, working with Stanley Tambiah. She then studied Social Anthropology at Cambridge University, working with Jack Goody and Ernest Gellner. In 1986 she received her PhD for work on modern-day witches in England, later published as Persuasions of the Witch's Craft (1989). In this book, she described the ways in which magic and other esoteric techniques both serve emotional needs and come to seem reasonable through the experience of practice.

Her second research project looked at the situation of contemporary Parsis, a Zoroastrian community in India. The Parsi community enjoyed a privileged position under the British Raj; although by many standards, Parsis continued to do well economically in post-colonial India, they have become politically marginal in comparison to their previous position. During Luhrmann's fieldwork in the 1990s, many Parsis speak pessimistically about the future of their community. Luhrmann's book The Good Parsi (1996) explored the contradictions inherent in the social psychology of a post-colonial elite.

Her third book explored the contradictions and tensions between two models of psychiatry, the psychodynamic (psychoanalytic) and the biomedical, through the ethnographic study of the training of American psychiatry residents during the health care transition of the early 1990s. Of Two Minds (2000) received several awards, including the Victor Turner Prize for Ethnographic Writing and the Boyer Prize for Psychological Anthropology (2001).

Her fourth book, When God Talks Back: Understanding the American Evangelical Relationship with God (March 2012), examines the growing movement of evangelical and charismatic Christianity, and specifically how practitioners come to experience God as someone with whom they can communicate on a daily basis through prayer and visualization. It was the focus of a book review symposium in Religion, Brain & Behavior.

Other projects she is working on include a NIMH-funded study of how life on the streets (chronically or periodically homeless) contributes to the experience and morbidity of schizophrenia.

Tanya Luhrmann was a faculty member in Anthropology at the University of California, San Diego, from 1989 to 2000. From 2000 to 2007, she was Max Palevsky Professor in the Department of Comparative Human Development at the University of Chicago, where she was also a director of the program in clinical ethnography. Since Spring 2007, she has been a professor of Anthropology at Stanford University.

She was elected a fellow of the American Academy of Arts and Sciences in 2003, president of the Society for Psychological Anthropology for 2008. She has received numerous awards for scholarship, including the American Anthropological Association's President's award for 2004 and a 2007 Guggenheim award.  In 2006, Luhrmann delivered the Lewis Henry Morgan Lecture at the University of Rochester, considered by many to be the most important annual lecture series in the field of anthropology.

Personal
Luhrmann is the sister of the late children's book author Anna Dewdney (author of the 'Llama Llama' series).

Select publications
 Luhrmann, Tanya M. (2022) How God Becomes Real: Kindling the Presence of Invisible Others. Princeton, NJ: Princeton University Press.
 Luhrmann, Tanya M. (2012) When God talks back: Understanding the American Evangelical Relationship with God. New York, NY: Alfred A. Knopf, Inc.
Luhrmann, Tanya M. (2004) "Metakinesis: How God Becomes Intimate in Contemporary U.S. Christianity". American Anthropologist 106:3:518-528.
 Luhrmann, Tanya M. (2000) Of two minds: The growing disorder in American psychiatry. New York, NY: Alfred A. Knopf, Inc.
 Luhrmann, Tanya M. (1996) The Good Parsi: the postcolonial anxieties of an Indian colonial elite. Cambridge, MA: Harvard University Press.
 Luhrmann, Tanya M. (1989) Persuasions of the Witch’s Craft. Cambridge, MA: Harvard University Press.

Interviews

References

External links 
 

Psychological anthropologists
Anthropologists of religion
American women anthropologists
1959 births
Living people
Radcliffe College alumni
Stanford University Department of Anthropology faculty
21st-century American women
Members of the American Philosophical Society